Stockholm a French solo album by Jean-Louis Aubert, released in 1997 by Virgin Records. It includes the singles "Océan" and "Le Jour Se Lève Encore".

Track listing
Side A
 [Intro] (0:13)
 "Stockholm" (3:29)
 "Océan" (4:24)
 "Le jour se lève encore" (3:38)
 "La p'tite semaine" (4:14)
 "Juste pour aujourd'hui" (5:38)
 "Vivrant poème" (3:35)
 "Abandonne-toi" (3:43)

Side B
"Je crois en tout, je n'crois en rien" (4:34)
 "Le milieu" (4:39)
 "La suite" (4:02)
 "Tombe de haut" (4:45)
 "Fais ton voyage" (4:40)
 "Baltic" (4:54)

Personnel
 Jean-Louis Aubert
 Gordon Cyrus - electronic drums, bass, effects, mixing
 Gunnar Norden - violins
 Doc Matéo - multi-instruments, mix
 Richard Kolinka - drums
 Ski - electronic drums on "Océan"
 Le Baron - guitar on "Le Jour se Lève Encore"
 Olive - guitar on "La P'tite Semaine"
 Tony Allen - drums on "Abandonne-toi"
 Mats Asplen - synthesizer on "Je Crois en tout, Je n'Croix en rien"
Technical
 Raphael - mixing

External links
Jean-Louis Aubert Official Website

1997 albums
Virgin Records albums